Dream was an American pop girl group best known for their transatlantic hit single "He Loves U Not". The group was active from 1998 through 2003 and briefly reunited in 2015, releasing the single "I Believe" before disbanding in 2016.

History

1998–2001: Formation 
The group was originally formed in October 1998. Talent scout Judith Fontaine selected Holly Blake-Arnstein, Melissa Schuman, Ashley Poole, and Alex Chester, four teens from California, to comprise a girl group called First Warning, which was later changed to Dream.

The group auditioned for Sean Combs and were subsequently signed to Bad Boy Records. Following this, the group stopped working with Fontaine, who later sued Combs and Blake-Arnstein, Schuman, and Poole, but lost her court case. In January 1999, Chester was replaced by Diana Ortiz.

2000–2001: It Was All a Dream 
Dream released their debut single "He Loves U Not" in 2000. "He Loves U Not" peaked at number 2 on the Billboard Hot 100, and number 17 on the UK Singles Chart. The video for the single peaked at number 2 on MTV's TRL. Their debut album It Was All a Dream was released on January 23, 2001. The second single from the album, "This Is Me", was not as successful, but the music video hit number 1 on TRL. An alternate song with the same name but different lyrics and production, titled "This Is Me (Remix)" was also released featuring rapper Kain and Sean Combs, and was later included on the compilation Totally Hits 2001. Bad Boy Records had planned to release more singles from It Was All a Dream, but these releases were later canceled. According to Blake-Arnstein, this was partly due to the impact of the September 11 terrorist attacks in 2001.

To promote It Was All a Dream, Dream participated in the 2001 TRL tour, and opened for Destiny's Child, Eve, NSYNC (No Strings Attached Tour) and Nelly. They were featured in a segment of MTV Cribs. Play Along Toys released dolls of the group in 2001. Dream made various appearances on television shows, including TRL, The Rosie O'Donnell Show, The Early Show, Live with Regis and Kelly, and Good Morning America.

2001–2003: Lineup change and disbandment 
In April 2002, Melissa Schuman left the group to pursue an acting career. A lengthy search conducted by Sean Combs and the three remaining members led to Kasey Sheridan joining the group in Fall 2002.

Dream spent the subsequent months recording new songs for their second album. In the summer of 2003, the group released the single "Crazy" featuring rapper Loon which coincided with a sexier image. Blake-Arnstein later noted that the sexier, more mature image pushed upon the group by Combs and their management was not a welcome change, and that she and the other members were no longer enjoying the experience. "Crazy" peaked at #39 on the Billboard Mainstream Top 40. Dream's album Reality was completed and was scheduled to be released in Fall 2003, but its release was repeatedly postponed by their label. The album did not see a wide release and was only released for digital download from the French Virgin Megastore website. Bad Boy Records later dropped Dream and they disbanded, though their dissolution was never formally announced.

2003–2012: Post-breakup activities 
Ashley Poole and Melissa Schuman pursued solo singing careers, and Holly Blake-Arnstein joined the California-based band Whirl Magnet.

On May 9, 2008, Clockwork Entertainment released two compilation albums titled Daddy's Little Girl and Dream Never Land. These albums feature demo songs recorded before their debut and include early member Alex Chester. Subsequently, Reality also became available for purchase on iTunes on May 13, 2008. A third compilation, Dream Back To You, was released in 2009.

In 2008, members Melissa Schuman, Ashley Poole, and Diana Ortiz started a new group under the name Lady Phoenix. A reality show documenting their search for new members was in the works, but was not picked up by any networks, and the group disbanded in 2012.

2015–2016: Comeback and "I Believe" 
On May 11, 2015, the original members of Dream posted a video online performing a acapella version of their 2000 single "He Loves U Not". On May 29, 2015, Dream announced they would be making a comeback and launched a new Twitter and Facebook page. On December 17, 2015, Dream released a studio recording of "O Holy Night".

On August 2, 2016, Dream released their first single together in 13 years, titled "I Believe".

In 2016, Dream opened for 98 Degrees on the My2K Tour. They also performed at the 2016 Mixtape Festival on August 6 with New Kids On The Block headlining. On August 25, 2016, Former member Kasey Sheridan joined Dream on stage to perform "Crazy" at the Microsoft Theater in Los Angeles, California.

On October 5, 2016, Ashley Poole announced that Dream had once again disbanded.

Discography

Studio albums

Compilation albums

Chart history

Awards and nominations

References

Further reading

External links

Archived version of Dream's official site – old lineup
Archived version of Dream's official site – 2003 lineup
Dream at Facebook
Dream at Instagram
Dream at Twitter

 
American pop music groups
American pop girl groups
Musical groups from Los Angeles
Musical groups established in 1998
Musical groups disestablished in 2003
Bad Boy Records artists
Musical groups reestablished in 2015
Musical groups disestablished in 2016
American contemporary R&B musical groups
Teen pop groups